The Maharashtra Public Service Commission (MPSC) is a body created by the Constitution of India under article 315 to select Group 'A' and Group 'B' civil servants for the  Indian state of Maharashtra according to the merits of the applicants and the rules of reservation.

The Head Office of the MPSC is located at the Maharashtra State Capital Mumbai.

Maharashtra Public Service Commission (MPSC) is a Constitutional Body established Under Article 315 of Constitution of India which provides a smooth and efficient functioning of the Government of Maharashtra by providing suitable candidates for various Government posts and advise them on various service matters like formulation of Recruitment Rules, advise on promotions, transfers and disciplinary actions etc.

MPSC EXAMS

There are some similarities between the Civil Service Examination at the Central Government level and the State Service Examination at the State Government level. For example, both of these tests lead to selection for the officer level. There are selections for officer posts at both Group-A and Group-B levels. Both these exams take place in three stages namely pre-examination, main examination, and personality test.

Selection for various posts is done through the State Service Examination of Maharashtra Public Service Commission. 
 MPSC State Services Examination - State Service Examination (verious Group A and Group B Gazzeted post)
 MPSC Maharashtra Forest Services Examination - Maharashtra Forest Service Examination 
 Maharashtra Agricultural Service Examination
 MPSC Maharashtra Engineering Services Gr-A Examination - Maharashtra Engineering Services Group A Exam 
 MPSC Maharashtra Engineering Services Gr-B Examination - Maharashtra Engineering Services Group B Exam 
 MPSC Civil Judge (Jr Div), Judicial Magistrate (Ist Class) Competitive Exam - Civil Judge, Junior Level & Justice Magistrate, First Class Exam 
 MPSC Asstt. Motor Vehicle Inspector Exam - Assistant Motor Vehicle Inspector Exam 
 MPSC Assist. Engineer (Electrical) Gr-II, Maharashtra Electrical Engg Services, B - Assistant Engineer (Electrical) Category-2, Maharashtra Electrical Engineering Services, Group-B 
 MPSC Police Sub-Inspector Examination - Police Sub-Inspector Examination] 
 MPSC Sales Tax Inspector Examination - Sales Tax Inspector Exam
 MPSC Tax Assistant Examination - Tax Assistant Group-A Exam 
 MPSC Assistant Examination - Assistant Exam 
 MPSC Clerk Typist Examination - Clerk-Typist Exam

Eligibility

Graduate candidates of any branch who have completed 19 years of age can appear for the ‘State Service Examination’. Candidates in the open group can appear for this examination till the age of 38 years and students in the reserved group can appear for this examination till the age of 43 years. According to the recent announcement of MPSC 2020-21 the commission has set the maximum numbers of attempts to candidates for applications. Candidate has no need to get Domicile Certificate of Maharashtra to appear for this examination. Although ‘State Service Examination’ can be given in Marathi or English language, the candidate needs to have knowledge of Marathi.

See also

 MPPSC
 UPSC  
 UPPSC
 List of Public service commissions in India

References

External links
Official Website of Maharashtra Public Service Commission

State agencies of Maharashtra
State public service commissions of India
Year of establishment missing